The representation of the Maldivian language in the Latin script varies from one scheme to another.

Major romanization methods

The following are the major romanization methods for Maldivian:

Malé Latin

Mālē Leṭin or Nasiri Latin is romanization scheme for Maldivian used as the official script from 1976 to 1978. It continues to be the most–used method of romanization for the Maldivian Language.

ISO 15919

ISO 15919 can be used to romanize Maldivian. Xavier Romero-Frias uses this scheme in his book The Maldive Islanders - A study of the popular culture of an ancient ocean kingdom.

Table

Consonants

Vowels

References

Notes

Maldivian language